A bung is an apparatus used to seal a container. It may also refer to:

Places
 Bung Bong, Victoria, in Australia
 Bung, Nepal, a Village Development Committee in Nepal

People
 Bung Tomo (1920-1981), an Indonesian military leader

Other
 Bung Enterprises, a defunct Hong Kong-based manufacturer of video game accessories
 Bung language, a nearly extinct language of Cameroon
 Bunghole, a hole bored in a liquid-tight barrel
 Bung or bunghole, a slang term for anus
 British slang for a bribe

See also
Bunger (disambiguation)
 Laboratory rubber stopper